Penry Gustavson (born May 20, 1970) is a member of the South Carolina Senate. She represents District 27.

References 

1970 births
Newberry College alumni
Living people
Republican Party South Carolina state senators
21st-century American politicians

Women state legislators in South Carolina
Women in the South Carolina State Senate